Pariksha Pe Charcha is an annual event held every year since 2018. During the event the Prime Minister of India interacts with students, teachers and parents from across the country, and shares valuable tips on how to take board and entrance exams in a relaxed and stress free manner.

Participants for the event are generally chosen through a competition. Winners of the competition are given a chance to attend the event, and some of the winners get a chance to interact directly with the Prime Minister.

History 
The first edition of Pariksha pe Charcha was held on 16 February 2018; the second edition was held on 29 January 2019, in New Delhi; the third was held in 2020 and the fourth one was held on 7 April 2021 through an online meeting and the latest edition was held on 27 january 2023.

Viral clip
On 29 January 2019, the second event of PPC, a clip went viral on social media in which a boy's mother asks for help to PM Modi, for whom he replied: "Ye PUBG wala hai kya?" (Is he of PUBG?).

References 

Narendra Modi
Modi administration initiatives
Student competitions